Eating Out is an American film series consisting of five LGBT-themed sex comedy films, beginning with Eating Out (2004). The series is distributed by Ariztical Entertainment. Simultaneous filming for Eating Out: Drama Camp and Eating Out: The Open Weekend took place in 2011.

Films 
Eating Out (2004)
Eating Out 2: Sloppy Seconds (2006)
Eating Out: All You Can Eat (2009)
Eating Out: Drama Camp (2011)
Eating Out: The Open Weekend (2011)

Cast members

References

 
American film series
American LGBT-related films
American romantic comedy films
American sex comedy films
English-language films
Film series introduced in 2004